William Gibbons Preston (September 29, 1842 – March 26, 1910) was an American architect who practiced during the last third of the nineteenth century and in the first decade of the twentieth.  Educated at Harvard University and the École des Beaux-Arts in Paris., he was active in Boston, New York, Rhode Island, Ohio, New Brunswick and Savannah, Georgia, where he was brought by George Johnson Baldwin to design the Chatham County courthouse. Preston stayed in Savannah for several years during which time designed the original Desoto Hotel (1890, demolished 1965), the Savannah Volunteer Guards Armory and 20 other distinguished public buildings and private homes. He began his professional career working for his father, the builder and architect Jonathan Preston (1801–1888), upon his return to the United States from the École in 1861, and was the sole practitioner in the office from the time his father retired c. 1875 until he took John Kahlmeyer as a partner in about 1885.

The drawings of the Preston firm, now owned by the Boston Public Library, make up "...one of the most complete sets of architectural graphics preserved from the nineteenth century."  Many of his buildings were pictured as prints in American Architect and Building News. He is credited with the introduction of the bungalow to the United States through a house loosely of the type that he designed in Monument Beach, Massachusetts in 1879. Preston was an early historic preservationist.  He was influential in the successful 1896 effort to prevent the Massachusetts state legislature from demolishing Boston's historic State House, which had been designed by the noted architect Charles Bulfinch and built in 1798.  Bulfinch was also an architect of the Capitol building in Washington, D.C.

Preston ran his practice for many years from a commercial and office building located at 186 Devonshire Street.  He designed Massachusetts Institute of Technology's Rogers Building in 1864, located on Boylston Street near Boston's Copley Square, which housed the school's architecture department. Floor plans for the building show a large, centrally located space devoted to an architectural library and museum. Drawings from the Study Collection were hung on the studio walls and numerous casts and other artifacts also lined the walls and picture rails.

Preston married Estelle M. Evans (1847–1920), whose father was the wealthy real estate developer Brice S. Evans, on December 6, 1866, and the couple had one son, Evans (1867–1900). William was an active member and fellow of the American Institute of Architects and served that organization in the office of first vice-president at the end of the 1890s. He was for many years a member of the Boston Society of Architects, and for thirty years served as its treasurer. He died at his home at 1063 Beacon Street in Brookline in 1910.

Selected projects

 Rogers Building of the Massachusetts Institute of Technology, (1864, demolished 1939) 491 Boylston Street, Boston MA., with his father Jonathan Preston
 New England Museum of Natural History (1865, with Jonathan Preston, extant) 234 Berkeley Street, Boston, MA – after a fifteen-month restoration in 2013 now RH Boston. 
 Charles Edward Cook house (c. 1870 – extant) 1 Gloucester St., Boston, MA
 Hotel Vendome (1871 – extant) 160 Commonwealth Avenue, Boston, MA, corner section by Preston, remainder by J.F. Ober and R. Rand in 1881
 World's Peace Jubilee Coliseum, 1872, Dartmouth Street and St. James Avenue, Boston, MA
 George H. Fales house (1873 – extant) 27 W. Main St., West Brookfield, MA
 Massachusetts State Prison – Third Place winning entry, (1874)
 Moody and Sankey Tabernacle, Tremont Street, Boston, MA (1876, demolished c. 1883) now the site of Boston Center for the Arts
J.C. Gilbert House(1876, extant) 40 Vautrinot Ave., Hull, MA
Thomas–Webster Estate, main house (1878 – extant) 238 Webster Street, Marshfield, MA
 Exhibition building at Rio de Janeiro (1878 – status unknown)
 Charles H. Bradshaw house, (1878, extant) 175 Summer Street, Spring Hill (Somerville), MA
 Police Station and Jail, (1878, demolished c.1975) 128 King Street E., Saint John, New Brunswick, Canada
 Seashore House, (1879, extant) 30 Highland Ave, Hull, MA; MA 
 Bungalow (1879 – status unknown) address unknown Monument Beach, MA
Mason Building, Liberty Square, (1880 – demolished) 70 Kilby Street, Boston
 Proposal for an International Exposition Building for the 1883 New York World's Fair (1880 – fair never held)
Massachusetts Charitable Mechanic Association building (1881, demolished 1959) Huntington Avenue and West Newton Street, Boston, MA
Hull Yacht Club,  (1882, demolished)  63 Highland Ave., Hull, MA
C. Kennard House, (1882, extant)  42 Western Ave., Hull, MA
 Pavilion at Friars Head (1882 – status not known) Campobello, New Brunswick
Jacob Sleeper Hall, Boston University, (1883, demolished) 688 Boylston Street, Boston, MA
The Hotel Aubry (1883, demolished 1959) 149 Newbury Street, Boston, MA (W.G. Preston & Albert C. Fernald)
 Lincoln Public Library (1884, extant, with subsequent additions by others) 3 Bedford Road Lincoln, MA
Claflin Building (1884, extant), 20 Beacon Street, Boston, MA, renovation of an 1873 building by others as the building for the Boston University School of Religious Education and Social Service, named for university founder Jacob Claflin. Alexander Graham Bell taught vocal physiology in the building. It has also held retail businesses and is now a residential condominium building.
Boston Terra Cotta Company's "New Building" (1885, demolished) 394 Federal St., Boston MA

 Savannah Cotton Exchange (1886, extant) 100 E. Bay Street, Savannah GA
 Greene's Inn (1887, –  burned c.1980 and subsequently demolished) 175 Ocean Road, Narragansett Pier, RI
 George Johnson Baldwin house (1887, extant) – 225 E. Hall, Savannah, GA. This house is notable for its "...tall ribbed chimneys and the elaborate stepped dormer(s)." 
Chadwick Lead Works, (1887, extant) 176–184 High Street, Boston
 "Gardencourt" Charles H. Pope house (c. 1888 – extant) 10 Gibson Avenue, Narragansett Pier, RI  now expanded and converted to a condominium community.
 Union Society Building (1889, extant)  121–125 Whitaker St., Savannah GA
 Chatham County (GA) Courthouse (1889, extant), 124 Bull Street, Savannah, GA
 Hotel De Soto (1890, demolished 1968), E. Liberty Street at Drayton Street, Savannah, GA, now the site of the Hilton DeSoto Hotel.
 Charles M. Russell mansion(1890 – demolished in 1966 and replaced by a Goodyear store) 328 Lincoln Way East, Massillon, OH
 St. Luke's Lutheran Church (1890, extant) Marlon Avenue and Park Avenue West, Mansfield, OH. Repurposed as a home.
 Francis H. Dewey house "Stonecroft" (1891 – extant) 362 Ocean Road, Narragansett Pier, RI 
 Marion Music Hall (1891 – extant) 164 Front Street, Marion, MA
Armory of the First Corps of Cadets of the Massachusetts Volunteer Militia (1891, completed 1897, extant), 97–105 Arlington Street, Boston, MA, pictured on August 20, 1892, American Architect and Building News
John Hancock Building (Devonshire) (1891, demolished c.1903) 178 Devonshire Street, Boston, MA
Savannah Volunteer Guards Armory, (1893, extant) 90–92 (now 342) Bull Street, Savannah, GA, now Poetter Hall, Savannah College of Art and Design.
 Central Exchange Building, (c.1895 – extant) 340 Main Street, Worcester, MA
Templeton Farm Colony of the Massachusetts School for the Feeble-Minded (Now Templeton Developmental Center), (1899, extant) 126 Royalston Road, Templeton, MA
Boston Transit Commission Building (1903, extant) 15 Beacon Street, Boston, MA
Dormitories and Electric Plant for the Massachusetts School for the Feeble-Minded (after 1925 the Walter E. Fernald State School), (1902, 1905, extant), 200 Trapelo Road, Waltham, MA
 International Trust Company Building (1906 – extant) 45 Milk Street, Boston, MA, substantial expansion of existing building by others.
 Quincy Market Cold Storage Warehouse (1906, demolished) 21–33 Eastern Avenue, Boston, MA
 Barn for the Massachusetts State Sanatorium (1908, demolished) State Hospital Road, Rutland, MA
Central Station of West End Street Railway Company, Boston
Boston Public Garden footbridge

Notes

References

Further reading
 City of Boston, Landmarks Commission. International Trust Company Building (45 Milk Street) Study Report, 1977. (Building designed by Preston)
Jean Ames Follett-Thompson: "The Business of Architecture – William Gibbons Preston and Architectural Professionalism in Boston in the Second Half of the Nineteenth Century," Ph.D. diss., Boston University, 1986

External links

 Boston Public Library. William G. Preston (1842–1910) Collection
 New York Public Library. View of the Coliseum, World's Peace Jubilee and International Musical Festival, 1872 (designed by Preston)
 http://communities.aia.org/sites/hdoaa/wiki/Wiki%20Pages/ahd1035887.aspx
 Hotel Vendome. Preston designed the corner building, 1871
 Poetter Hall historical marker
  The Next Phase Blog – Social commentary and opinions: No guns, politics, or religion. Boston's Hidden Gems: New England Museum Restoration – This is the seventh in a series of posts on largely unknown spaces in Boston that are open to the public.
  225 East Hall (or the George Baldwin House) – Page 1 (of two pages), William Gibbons Preston, 1887, Mary Ann Sullivan, Bluffington University 
 International Trust Company Building – 45 Milk Street, Boston – Boston Landmarks Commission Study Report 
 Lost New England – Hotel Vendome, Boston 
 PHOTOS, PRINTS, DRAWINGS – Savannah Historic District, Whitfield Building (Union Society Building), 121–125 Whitaker Street, Savannah, Chatham County, GA 
 Charitably Speaking - "MCMA History" 

1842 births
1910 deaths
Architects from Boston
19th century in Boston
Harvard School of Engineering and Applied Sciences alumni